The 1986 All-Ireland Senior Football Championship Final was the 99th All-Ireland Final and the deciding match of the 1986 All-Ireland Senior Football Championship, an inter-county Gaelic football tournament for the top teams in Ireland.

Match

Summary
Tyrone were seven points clear at one point, but went on to lose by eight, Pat Spillane and Mikey Sheehy scoring goals.

It was the fifth of five All-Ireland football titles won by Kerry in the 1980s. Kerry did not win another All-Ireland football title until 1997.

This was also the first Championship meeting of Kerry and Tyrone.

Details

References

External links
 Crowe, Dermot. "Plunkett Donaghy's passion for Tyrone burns brighter than ever". Sunday Independent. 11 August 2019.

1
All-Ireland Senior Football Championship Final
All-Ireland Senior Football Championship Final, 1986
All-Ireland Senior Football Championship Finals
All-Ireland Senior Football Championship Finals
Kerry county football team matches
Tyrone county football team matches